Howard "Howie" Jolliff (born July 20, 1938) is an American former professional basketball player. Jolliff was selected in the 1960 NBA Draft by the Minneapolis Lakers after a collegiate career at Ohio University. In his NBA career, Jolliff averaged 2.8 points, 4.2 rebounds, and 0.8 assists per game while playing for the Lakers.

In 2010, ESPN ranked him as the "least productive player in Lakers history" among players who had played in at least 100 games for the team.

References

1938 births
Living people
American men's basketball players
Basketball players from Canton, Ohio
Centers (basketball)
High school basketball coaches in the United States
Los Angeles Lakers players
Minneapolis Lakers draft picks
Ohio Bobcats men's basketball players
Power forwards (basketball)